Poppo II (died 1098), Count of Weimar-Orlamünde, was margrave of Carniola from 1070 and of Istria from 1096 to his death.

Life
Poppo was the son of Margrave Ulric I of Carniola, whom he succeeded upon his death in 1070. His mother Sophia was a daughter of King Béla I of Hungary. He was thus of royal blood.

He married Richgard (lt: Richardis), daughter of Count Engelbert of Sponheim (de), who governed Istria until his death on 1 April 1096. According to the 1170 Historia Welforum chronicle, Poppo and Richgard had two daughters:
Sophia of Istria (d. 1132), married Count Berthold II of Andechs, mother of Margrave Berthold I of Istria (1110 or 1122 – 1188)
Hedwig, married firstly Count Herman I of Winzenburg and secondly Count Adalbert II of Bogen.

Poppo remained a loyal supporter of the Salian emperor Henry IV during the Investiture Controversy. Because of his lack of surviving sons, he was succeeded by his younger brother Ulric II.

References
Medieval Lands Project: Nobility of Northern Italy (900–1100).

1098 deaths
Margraves of Istria
Margraves of Carniola
Year of birth unknown